Gibraltar International Airport or North Front Airport  is the civilian airport that serves the British overseas territory of Gibraltar. The runway is owned by the Ministry of Defence for use by the Royal Air Force as RAF Gibraltar. Civilian operators use the civilian-operated terminal. National Air Traffic Services hold the contract for provision of air navigation services at the airport.

In 2017, the airport handled 571,184 passengers and 302,094 kg of cargo on 4,888 total flights. Winston Churchill Avenue (the main road heading towards the land border with Spain) intersects the airport runway, and consequently has to be closed every time a plane lands or departs. The History Channel programme Most Extreme Airports ranked the airport the fifth most extreme airport in the world, ahead of the now-defunct Kai Tak Airport with its infamous right-hand turn approach over central Hong Kong before landing, but behind Princess Juliana International Airport, famous for its low-altitude approaches over a public beach. It is exposed to strong cross winds around the rock and across the Bay of Gibraltar, making landings in winter particularly challenging.

Monarch Airlines was the largest operator at Gibraltar, operating flights to Birmingham, London Gatwick, London Luton, and Manchester. Monarch entered administration at 4:30 am on 2 October 2017, ceasing operations with immediate effect around a year after rumours of its imminent demise became widespread. As of 2021 EasyJet is the largest airline operator, with the airport also being served by British Airways.

Although located in Gibraltar, the airport is also used by people travelling to or from neighbouring parts of southern Spain such as the Costa del Sol or the Campo de Gibraltar.

History

Construction
The airport was constructed during World War II upon the territory's race course (introduced by the Maltese), when Gibraltar was an important naval base for the British. Opened in 1939, it was only an emergency airfield for the Royal Navy's Fleet Air Arm. However, the runway was later extended by reclaiming some land from the Bay of Gibraltar using rock blasted from the Rock of Gibraltar while carrying out works on military tunnels. This last major extension of the runway allowed larger aircraft to land at Gibraltar.

Business development since the 2000s
On 3 November 2003, Monarch announced a new route from Gibraltar to Manchester Airport. It was the first route from Gibraltar to operate to the North of England. However, on 19 July 2006, Monarch withdrew the route due to the cost. On 21 April 2008, Monarch announced it would resume the services to Manchester from 12 September 2008. The route operated three to five times a week: every Monday, Wednesday and Friday in winter season, as well as on Thursdays and Sundays in the summer season.

By late 2005 and early 2006, the implementation of a new agreement was one of the main topics of the Gibraltar Trilateral Forum being held between the Governments of Gibraltar, Spain and the United Kingdom. As a result, the Córdoba Accord was signed on 18 September 2006 by all parties. This ended all discriminatory restrictions on civilian flights to Gibraltar International, including the prohibition of flights over Spanish soil, and exclusion of Gibraltar from all EU agreements on air transport, allowing civilian flights from all nations into Gibraltar International.

On 17 November 2006 Iberia announced that it would start flights from Madrid to Gibraltar using an Airbus A319 aircraft. This was a landmark move as no Spanish airline had flown to Gibraltar since 1979, because of its disputed status. Iberia began flights to Gibraltar International on 16 December 2006 with a flight from Madrid that included some members of the Spanish Government on board. GB Airways flew a one-off flight in the other direction with a group of children from the Gibraltar area making up the passengers. In May 2007 GB Airways (flying as a British Airways franchisee) also began operating the route between Madrid and Gibraltar, however, this was discontinued on 30 September, leaving Iberia to work the route alone. On 22 September 2008 Iberia announced that it would cease its flights to Madrid by 28 September due to "economic reasons", namely, lack of demand. This left Gibraltar, once again, without any air links with Spain.

In April 2009, Ándalus Líneas Aéreas restored Gibraltar's air link with the Spanish capital. In July 2009 Ándalus also began scheduled flights to Barcelona, increasing the destinations in Spain to two. However, the airline ceased to serve this route in September 2009 due to a lack of demand. In April 2010, it was confirmed that Ándalus flights to and from Gibraltar had been indefinitely suspended. And now yet again, Gibraltar has no direct air links to Spain. Ándalus Líneas Aéreas ceased operations on 13 August 2010.

In 2009, British Airways moved its flights from Gatwick to its main base at London Heathrow.

From 2011 until October 2012, easyJet offered thrice-weekly service from Gibraltar to Liverpool, but it was eventually cancelled due to lack of demand.

On 18 May 2011, Bmibaby announced that it would launch flights from Gibraltar to East Midlands from 31 March 2012. This was the first time that an airline has operated that route. The route operated on Tuesdays, Thursdays and Saturdays, using a Boeing 737-300. However, on 3 May 2012 it was announced that Bmibaby was to be closed by the International Airlines Group after the group failed to find a buyer for the airline. Bmibaby operated its last service to Gibraltar on 8 September 2012 and the airline operated its last flight the following day.

On 10 January 2012, Gibraltar was selected as one of the 'World's Scariest Airport Landings and Take-offs' in the travel section of the Daily Telegraph due to its runway which extends into the sea.

On 14 August 2012, Monarch announced it would launch a new route to Birmingham, operating three times a week; every Tuesday, Thursday and Saturday. The route began on 23 March 2013 but changed to running on Tuesdays, Thursdays and Sundays.

In the summer of 2014 services between Gibraltar and Marrakech were operated by Royal Air Maroc Express on behalf of a local travel company, Your Flight. However, the services, which were operated on a charter basis, and could not be booked via global distribution system channels or on a connection basis, terminated after just three months due to insufficient demand.

In November 2014, easyJet announced that it would begin a new route to Bristol Airport which commenced on 19 April 2015.

Royal Air Maroc announced in November 2014 that after many years, it would restore the short intercontinental air connection between Gibraltar and Tangier in March 2015 on a twice weekly basis. Unlike the previous Marrakech flights these would be operated by RAM for themselves, and offer connecting flights to their Casablanca hub and onwards, and be available via normal sales channels.

Overnight work to resurface the runway started on the evening of September 4, 2015, and the work was completed in January 2016.

In November 2015, easyJet announced that it would begin a new route to Manchester Airport twice weekly, making this the first time two airlines have competed against each other on the Manchester-Gibraltar route. The new route commenced on 3 July 2016. During the same month, Monarch announced a new route from Gibraltar to London Gatwick, beginning on 1 May running four times a week.

On 2 October 2017, the CAA confirmed that Monarch Airlines had ceased operations with immediate effect and had entered administration. All flights were cancelled. Monarch operated about a third of the airports movements prior to shutting down.

On 12 July 2018, easyJet announced a twice-weekly new route to London-Luton restoring the link between the two airports. The restored route started in December 2018.

On 11 December 2019, easyJet announced a new twice-weekly service to Edinburgh, making it the first time that Gibraltar has had a direct link to Scotland. The route was due to start on 31 March 2020 however due to the COVID-19 pandemic the route finally commenced on 5 June 2021 after several reschedulings. EasyJet resumed services from Manchester on 20 July, Gatwick on 25 July, and Bristol on 4 August. The airlines service to Luton was axed as a result of the pandemic and increased competition from Wizz Air who began serving the route in December 2020.

In October 2020, Hélity announced a new route to Málaga beginning 30 October with flights operating three times a week on Monday, Wednesday and Friday.

On 4 February 2021, Eastern Airways announced two new routes to Southampton and Birmingham from 24 and 28 May. This marked the first time that Eastern Airways were to operate scheduled flights from the Airport, as well as the first ever route to Southampton and the resumption of the Birmingham service that was lost after Monarch's collapse in October 2017.

Disputes regarding territory's status 
The airport is located on the isthmus that connects Gibraltar with the rest of the Iberian Peninsula. Whether or not the airport's territory was ceded by the Treaty of Utrecht is disputed by Spain and Britain.
In the spring of 1815, Spain claims an epidemic of yellow fever struck Gibraltar, so that the British authorities built several barracks as field isolation in the neutral zone. On 20 April 1815 Lt. Governor of Gibraltar, George Don agreed with the general commander of the Campo de Gibraltar, General Don José María de Alós, that "a large proportion of the inhabitants [of Gibraltar] to [..] not [have] they suffered fever, temporarily established on the neutral ground, as close as circumstances permit, in front of this fortress".

Spain's continuing sovereignty dispute with the United Kingdom over the territory on which the airport stands (different from the generic one on Gibraltar itself) has seriously affected the airport's operations. On 2 December 1987, an agreement was signed between the governments of the United Kingdom and Spain to allow the joint civil use of the airport. The agreement foresaw the building of a new terminal in the neighbouring Spanish municipality of La Línea de la Concepción adjacent to the northern side of the existing frontier. However, the agreement was blocked by the Government of Gibraltar, led from 1988 by Joe Bossano. As a result, the agreement was never implemented.

Since then, Spain successfully excluded Gibraltar from European-wide de-regulation initiatives, such as the Single European Sky programme preventing direct links from Gibraltar to the European Union, on the grounds that no regulation that somehow recognises the sovereignty of the United Kingdom over the Gibraltar peninsula may be implemented without a previous agreement on the airport.

Terminals

There is one terminal at Gibraltar International.

Old terminal
The old terminal at the airport was built in 1959 and refurbished in the late 1990s. For many years, it had been too small to cope with the number of passengers when two flights were scheduled to arrive/depart within a short space of time. On 26 November 2011, arriving flights switched to the new terminal as the first phase of the new terminal opened. On 25 September 2012, the old terminal closed its doors as flight departures moved into the new terminal on 26 September 2012. The last flight to use it was easyJet flight EZY8904 to London-Gatwick. The old terminal building was demolished in February 2014.

New terminal
A new terminal was constructed at Gibraltar International due to increasing numbers of passengers. Planning permission was announced in 2007 with construction of the new terminal beginning in 2009 and completed in 2011. The first phase of the new terminal opened on 26 November 2011 for arriving flights only. The second phase of the new terminal opened on 26 September 2012 when flight departures moved. The first flight to use the first phase was EasyJet flight EZY7295 from Liverpool and the first flight to use the second phase was British Airways flight BA491 to London Heathrow. The terminal's terrace was inaugurated by the Earl of Wessex, Prince Edward on 13 June 2012.

It has two baggage carousels and three departure gates, none of which are equipped with jet bridges. It has a passenger capacity of up to 1.5 million passengers per year. Retail services are also available in the terminal and these include WH Smith, 36 North Bar and Gibraltar Duty Free Stores. A new general aviation area has also been built inside the terminal to handle private aircraft.

Expansion

New road access

The road across the runway is constraining operations at the airport, especially with the increase in operations since the Córdoba Agreement. Prior to this agreement, only three flights operated daily to Gatwick and Luton, and three flights a week to Manchester. On busy days, at present, some seven flights now arrive and depart. If the average time the road is closed for an aircraft to land or depart is ten minutes, then on certain days the road can be closed for over half an hour.

Because of this, a new four-lane diversion road and tunnel section was planned. The new runway tunnel will reduce delays and tailbacks caused by aircraft taking off and landing. Construction of the new road was due to begin in January 2008 and be completed by the beginning of 2009, but as of 2016 it remained incomplete. Although the road across the runway is to remain in place, for exceptional, specific, or emergency use, it will not be available for routine day-to-day use by private vehicular traffic. Pedestrians will not be required to travel via the new road/tunnel, and will continue to cross the runway at the present location. A prolonged litigation between the Government of Gibraltar and contractor OHL over the delay was resolved in June 2016 with an agreement for OHL to complete the works at a price of £24 million and a projected finish date of November 2018. The most recent estimate for completion of the project is the end of the 2022.

A new dual-carriageway is also being built. It will pass under the new terminal and towards the eastern edge of the runway at which point it will pass through a tunnel under it and connect via a roundabout with Devil's Tower Road on the opposite side of the runway. After the road tunnel on the north side of the runway the new road will run parallel to the frontier, passing under the air terminal fly-over section. The road will then branch into two, with one road leading to the loop and the frontier, and another leading to the Air Terminal, North Front and Winston Churchill Avenue.

New car parks
A number of car parks are being built at Gibraltar International during its expansion, including a new 220-space, three-story car park located at the east of the new terminal. Another new car park is to be built by Eastern Beach, and two multi-storey facilities will also be built on Devil's Tower Road.

Airlines and destinations
The following airlines operate regular scheduled and charter flights at Gibraltar Airport:

Statistics

Accidents and incidents
On 4 July 1943, a B-24 Liberator crashed into the sea 16 seconds after taking off from Gibraltar Airport at 23:07 hours, killing all 11 passengers and 5 of the 6 crew. Among the passengers was Lt. Gen. Władysław Sikorski, commander-in-chief of the Polish Army and Prime Minister of the Polish government in exile, who had been inspecting Polish forces in the Middle East during World War II. A British inquiry ruled the crash an accident, concluding that the plane's controls had jammed for an unknown reason. However, several conspiracy theories continue to persist.
On 3 August 1983 an English Electric Canberra T.17 (WJ625) of 360 Sqdn crashed into the sea at the eastern end of the runway. The aircraft entered cloud shortly after a three aircraft take off. WJ625 crashed into the Mediterranean Sea after the pilot became disoriented and lost control. All three crew were killed.
On 22 May 2002, a Monarch Boeing 757-200 (Registration G-MONC) suffered structural damage to the forward fuselage in the area of the nose landing gear during landing at Gibraltar while operating a flight from Luton. The captain had used an incorrect landing technique, applying full nose-down elevator. This control input resulted in a high pitch-down rate at nose-wheel touchdown, exceeding the design limits, before the aircraft's nose-wheel had touched the ground. There were no injuries.
On 17 March 2006, the flight deck crew of a Monarch Boeing 757-200 (Registration G-MONE) lost visual contact with the runway after passing the Visual Decision Point (VDP) while attempting to land at Gibraltar. During the subsequent go-around, the crew did not follow the correct missed approach procedures but air traffic control (ATC) provided effective heading control to avoid striking high ground. Following the incident, ATC and Monarch changed their procedures to reduce the chances of repeating a similar occurrence.
On 8 February 2017, a Royal Gibraltar Police vehicle drove onto the runway in a bid to stop an Airbus A400M Atlas plane from taking off. The ensuing stand off between the RGP and MOD caused delays of two hours for anyone crossing the runway via the road crossing. This was due to a serving member of the military on board the RAF aircraft being wanted by the RGP for alleged sex offences. The suspect was eventually removed from the aircraft as well as his personal computer equipment and the plane was allowed to leave two hours later.

In popular culture
The runway featured in a BBC Top Gear special and was also used by Jaguar in the launch of a new range. A custom painted Boeing 737 was used in conjunction with a fleet of the cars. The airport appeared on Channel 5's series, Gibraltar: Britain in the Sun which was broadcast from June to July 2013.

The airstrip and the Four Corners Border crossing feature at the end of Carol Reed's 1963 production of The Running Man. Several 'takes' were shot as Remick and Harvey chase each other, firstly through the Border and later as the light aircraft took off from the Eastern end of the runway, narrowly missing an RAF Halifax aircraft which was supposed to be taking off too.

See also 
 List of airports in the United Kingdom and the British Crown Dependencies
 Algeciras Heliport, heliport in nearby Spain

References

External links

 
 Press Release for New Air Terminal, tunnel under the runway and new road leading to all parts of Gibraltar north of the runway
 Artist's rendition and architectural designs for new Terminal
 Airport webcams, flight timetables and pilot data

Airports in Gibraltar
1939 establishments in Gibraltar
World War II sites in Gibraltar
Airports established in 1939